Hemicrepidius bilobatus is a species of click beetle belonging to the family Elateridae.

References

External links
Images of Hemicrepidius bilobatus on BugGuide

Beetles described in 1834
bilobatus